This list of members of the House Un-American Activities Committee details the names of those members of the United States House of Representatives who served on the House Un-American Activities Committee (HUAC) from its formation as the "Special Committee to Investigate Un-American Activities" in 1938 until the dissolution of the "House Internal Security Committee" in 1975.

New members of the committee marked with bold type.

Special Committee to Investigate Un-American Activities (1938-1944)   

Commonly known as the "Dies Committee." The permanent secretary of the committee was Robert E. Stripling throughout.

75th Congress (1938)

 Martin Dies, Jr. (D-Texas), Chairman 
 John J. Dempsey (D-New Mexico)
 Arthur D. Healey (D-Massachusetts)
 Harold G. Mosier (D-Ohio)
 Joe Starnes (D-Alabama)
 Noah M. Mason (R-Illinois)
 J. Parnell Thomas (R-New Jersey)

76th Congress (1939-1940)

 Martin Dies, Jr. (D-Texas), Chairman
 John J. Dempsey (D-New Mexico)
 Arthur D. Healey (D-Massachusetts)
 Joseph E. Casey (D-Massachusetts) —replacement for Healey
 Joe Starnes (D-Alabama)
 Jerry Voorhis (D- California)
 Noah M. Mason (R-Illinois)
 J. Parnell Thomas (R-New Jersey)

77th Congress (1941-1942)

 Martin Dies, Jr. (D-Texas), Chairman
 Harry P. Beam (D-Illinois)
 Joseph E. Casey (D-Massachusetts)
 Joe Starnes (D-Alabama)
 Jerry Voorhis (D- California)
 Noah M. Mason (R-Illinois)
 J. Parnell Thomas (R-New Jersey)

78th Congress (1943-1944)

 Martin Dies, Jr. (D-Texas), Chairman
 Wirt Courtney (D-Tennessee)
 John M. Costello (D-California)
 Herman P. Eberharter (D-Pennsylvania)
 Joe Starnes (D-Alabama)
 Noah M. Mason (R-Illinois)
 Fred E. Busbey (R-Illinois) —Replacement for Mason in 1944.
 Karl E. Mundt (R-South Dakota)
 J. Parnell Thomas (R-New Jersey)

Committee on Un-American Activities (1945-1968)

Effective with the 79th Congress of 1945, the former special committee of the House of Representatives was made permanent, expanded to 9 members, and renamed. Permanent secretaries of the committee would be Robert E. Stripling (1945-1948), John W. Carrington (1949-1952), Thomas W. Beale, Sr. (1953-1956), Richard Arens (1957-1960), Frank S. Tavenner, Jr. (1961-1962), Francis J. McNamara (1963-1968).

79th Congress (1945-1946)

 Edward J. Hart (D-New Jersey), Chairman
 John S. Wood (D-Georgia) —Replacement for Hart as Chairman.
 Herbert C. Bonner (D-North Carolina)
 John R. Murdock (D-Arizona)
 J. Hardin Peterson (D-Florida)
 John E. Rankin (D-Mississippi)
 J. W. Robinson (D-Utah)
 Gerald W. Landis (R-Indiana)
 Karl E. Mundt (R-South Dakota)
 J. Parnell Thomas (R-New Jersey)

80th Congress (1947-1948)

 J. Parnell Thomas (R-New Jersey), Chairman
 John McDowell (R-Pennsylvania)
 Karl E. Mundt (R-South Dakota)
 Richard M. Nixon (R-California)
 Richard B. Vail (R-Illinois)
 Herbert C. Bonner (D-North Carolina)
 F. Edward Hébert (D-Louisiana) —Replacement for Bonner in 1948.
 J. Hardin Peterson (D-Florida)
 John E. Rankin (D-Mississippi)
 John S. Wood (D-Georgia)
 Harold F. Youngblood (R-Michigan)

81st Congress (1949-1950)

 John S. Wood (D-Georgia), Chairman
 Burr P. Harrison (D-Virginia)
 John McSweeney (D-Ohio)
 Morgan M. Moulder (D-Missouri)
 Francis E. Walter (D-Pennsylvania)
 Francis Case (R-South Dakota)
 Richard M. Nixon (R-California)
 J. Parnell Thomas (R-New Jersey) —Ranking Republican in 1949, vacated position by end of that year, leaving Nixon as ranking Republican.
 Harold H. Velde (R-Illinois)

82nd Congress (1951-1952)

 John S. Wood (D-Georgia), Chairman
 Clyde Doyle (D-California)
 James B. Frazier, Jr. (D-Tennessee)
 Morgan M. Moulder (D-Missouri)
 Francis E. Walter (D-Pennsylvania)
 Donald L. Jackson (R-California)
 Bernard W. "Pat" Kearney (R-New York)
 Charles E. Potter (R-Michigan)
 Harold H. Velde (R-Illinois)

83rd Congress (1953-1954)

 Harold H. Velde (R-Illinois), Chairman
 Kit Clardy (R-Michigan)
 Donald L. Jackson (R-California)
 Bernard W. "Pat" Kearney (R-New York)
 Gordon H. Scherer (R-Ohio)
 Clyde Doyle (D-California)
 James B. Frazier, Jr. (D-Tennessee)
 Morgan M. Moulder (D-Missouri)
 Francis E. Walter (D-Pennsylvania)

84th Congress (1955-1956)

 Francis E. Walter (D-Pennsylvania), Chairman
 Clyde Doyle (D-California)
 James B. Frazier, Jr. (D-Tennessee)
 Morgan M. Moulder (D-Missouri)
 Edwin E. Willis (D-Louisiana)
 Donald L. Jackson (R-California)
 Bernard W. "Pat" Kearney (R-New York)
 Gordon H. Scherer (R-Ohio)
 Harold H. Velde (R-Illinois)

85th Congress (1957-1958)

 Francis E. Walter (D-Pennsylvania), Chairman
 Clyde Doyle (D-California)
 James B. Frazier, Jr. (D-Tennessee)
 Morgan M. Moulder (D-Missouri)
 Edwin E. Willis (D-Louisiana)
 Donald L. Jackson (R-California)
 Bernard W. "Pat" Kearney (R-New York)
 Robert J. McIntosh (R-Michigan)
 Gordon H. Scherer (R-Ohio)

86th Congress (1959-1960)

 Francis E. Walter (D-Pennsylvania), Chairman
 Clyde Doyle (D-California)
 Morgan M. Moulder (D-Missouri)
 William M. Tuck (D-Virginia)
 Edwin E. Willis (D-Louisiana)
 Donald L. Jackson (R-California)
 August E. Johansen (R-Michigan)
 William E. Miller (R-New York)
 Gordon H. Scherer (R-Ohio)

87th Congress (1961-1962)

 Francis E. Walter (D-Pennsylvania), Chairman
 Clyde Doyle (D-California)
 Morgan M. Moulder (D-Missouri)
 William M. Tuck (D-Virginia)
 Edwin E. Willis (D-Louisiana)
 Donald C. Bruce (R-Indiana)
 August E. Johansen (R-Michigan)
 Gordon H. Scherer (R-Ohio)
 Henry C. Schadeberg (R-Wisconsin)

88th Congress (1963-1964)

 Francis E. Walter (D-Pennsylvania), Chairman —Died May 31, 1963.
 Richard H. Ichord (D-Missouri) —Member of the committee in 1964.
 Clyde Doyle (D-California) (1963)
 George F. Senner, Jr. (D-Arizona) —Member of the committee in 1964.
 Joe R. Pool (D-Texas)
 William M. Tuck (D-Virginia)
 Edwin E. Willis (D-Louisiana)
 John M. Ashbrook (R-Ohio)
 Donald C. Bruce (R-Indiana)
 August E. Johansen (R-Michigan)
 Henry C. Schadeberg (R-Wisconsin)

89th Congress (1965-1966)

 Edwin E. Willis (D-Louisiana), Chairman
 Richard H. Ichord (D-Missouri) 
 Joe R. Pool (D-Texas)
 George F. Senner, Jr. (D-Arizona)
 William M. Tuck (D-Virginia)
 Charles L. Weltner (D-Georgia)
 John M. Ashbrook (R-Ohio)
 John H. Buchanan, Jr. (R-Alabama)
 Del Clawson (R-California)

90th Congress (1967-1968)

 Edwin E. Willis (D-Louisiana), Chairman
 John C. Culver (D-Iowa)
 Richard H. Ichord (D-Missouri) 
 Joe R. Pool (D-Texas)
 William M. Tuck (D-Virginia)
 John M. Ashbrook (R-Ohio)
 Del Clawson (R-California)
 Richard L. Roudebush (R-Indiana)
 Albert W. Watson (R-South Carolina)

Committee on Internal Security

In February 1969 the name of the committee was changed for a second time. The 9 member Committee on Internal Security would remain in existence until 1975. Chief professional staff members of the Committee on Internal Security included  Donald G. Sanders (1969-1973), Robert M. Horner (???-1973), and William H. Stapleton (1974-1975).

The House Committee on Internal Security was formally terminated on January 14, 1975, the day of the opening of the 94th Congress. The Committee's files and staff were transferred on that day to the House Judiciary Committee from whence the Internal Security Committee had sprung.

91st Congress (1969-1970)

 Richard H. Ichord (D-Missouri), Chairman
 Edwin W. Edwards (D-Louisiana)
 Claude Pepper (D-Florida)
 Richardson Preyer (D-North Carolina)
 Louis Stokes (D-Ohio)
 John M. Ashbrook (R-Ohio)
 Richard L. Roudebush (R-Indiana)
 William J. Scherle (R-Iowa)
 Albert W. Watson (R-South Carolina)

92nd Congress (1971-1972)

 Richard H. Ichord (D-Missouri), Chairman
 Mendel J. Davis (D-South Carolina)
 Robert F. Drinan (D-Massachusetts)
 Claude Pepper (D-Florida)
 Richardson Preyer (D-North Carolina)
 John M. Ashbrook (R-Ohio)
 John G. Schmitz (R-California)
 Fletcher Thompson (R-Georgia)
 Roger H. Zion (R-Indiana)

93rd Congress (1973-1974)

 Mendel J. Davis (D-South Carolina)
 Robert F. Drinan (D-Massachusetts)
 Claude Pepper (D-Florida)
 Richardson Preyer (D-North Carolina)
 John M. Ashbrook (R-Ohio)
 J. Herbert Burke (R-Florida)
 Tennyson Guyer (R-Ohio)
 Roger H. Zion (R-Indiana)

See also

 List of organizations described as Communist fronts by the US government

Footnotes

Further reading

 William F. Buckley, The Committee and Its Critics; a Calm Review of the House Committee on Un-American Activities. New York: Putnam Books, 1962.
 Robert K. Carr, The House Committee on Un-American Activities. Ithaca, NY: Cornell University Press, 1952.
 Frank J. Donner, The Un-Americans. New York: Ballantine Books, 1961.
 Walter Goodman, The Committee: The Extraordinary Career of the House Committee on Un-American Activities. New York: Farrar Straus & Giroux, 1968.
 Joseph Litvak, The Un-Americans : Jews, the Blacklist, and Stoolpigeon Culture. Durham, NC: Duke University Press, 2009.
 Kenneth O'Reilly, Hoover and the Unamericans: The FBI, HUAC, and the Red Menace. Philadelphia: Temple University Press, 1983.

Legal history of the United States
Anti-communism in the United States
Cold War history of the United States
Political repression in the United States
Un-American activities
McCarthyism